Buléon is a commune in the Morbihan department of Brittany in northwestern France.

Population
Inhabitants of Buléon are called in French Buléonais.

See also
Communes of the Morbihan department

References

External links

Mayors of Morbihan Association 

Communes of Morbihan